Uvarovsky District is an administrative and municipal district (raion), one of the twenty-three in Tambov Oblast, Russia. It is located in the southeast of the oblast. The district borders with Inzhavinsky District in the north, Muchkapsky District in the east, Gribanovsky District of Voronezh Oblast in the south, and with Zherdevsky District in the west. Its administrative center is the town of Uvarovo (which is not administratively a part of the district). Population: 11,221 (2010 Census);

Administrative and municipal status
Within the framework of administrative divisions, Uvarovsky District is one of the twenty-three in the oblast. The town of Uvarovo serves as its administrative center, despite being incorporated separately as a town of oblast significance—an administrative unit with the status equal to that of the districts.

As a municipal division, the district is incorporated as Uvarovsky Municipal District. The town of oblast significance of Uvarovo is incorporated separately from the district as Uvarovo Urban Okrug.

References

Notes

Sources

Districts of Tambov Oblast
